Ildar Shiksatdarov (born 11 July 1994) is a Russian professional ice hockey forward. He is currently a free agent.

He originally made his professional debut and appeared in 6 seasons with HC Neftekhimik Nizhnekamsk.

Career statistics

Regular season and playoffs

References

External links

1994 births
Living people
HC Neftekhimik Nizhnekamsk players
Severstal Cherepovets players
MHk 32 Liptovský Mikuláš players
HC Vityaz players
Ice hockey people from Moscow
Russian expatriate ice hockey people
Russian expatriate sportspeople in Slovakia
Expatriate ice hockey players in Slovakia